The 1st North Carolina Regiment of the Continental Army was raised on September 1, 1775, at Wilmington, North Carolina (originally authorized by the North Carolina Provincial Congress as state troops but on November 28, 1775, it became part of the Continental Army per direction of the Continental Congress). In January 1776 the organization contained eight companies. Francis Nash was appointed colonel in April 1776. The regiment was present at the defense of Charleston in 1776. It transferred from the Southern Department to George Washington's main army in February 1777. At that time, Thomas Clark became colonel of the 1st Regiment. The regiment became part of General Francis Nash's North Carolina Brigade in July.

Commanders
The commanders were full colonels and included:
 Col. James Moore:  He was commissioned as colonel/commandant on August 21, 1775, and served until April 10, 1776, when he was commissioned as Brigadier General of the 1st Brigade of the North Carolina line. This brigade included the 4th, 5th and 6th Regiments.
 Col. Francis Nash: He was commissioned as colonel/commandant on April 10, 1776.  He served until February 5, 1777, when he was promoted to Brigadier General of the 3rd North Carolina Brigade commanded by General James Moore until his death.  
 Col. Thomas Clark: The Continental Congress promoted him to colonel/commandant of the 1st North Carolina Regiment on February 5, 1777, upon General Nash's promotion.  He was promoted to brigadier general of the North Carolina Brigade on May 15, 1778.  In early 1780, he was again given command of the 1st North Carolina Regiment.  He was captured at the siege of Charleston on May 12, 1780, and was not released until November 26, 1782. He retired on January 1, 1783.  
 Lt. Col. William Lee Davidson: He served as the colonel/commandant of the 1st North Carolina Regiment from January 9, 1779, until 1780.

Known lieutenant colonels included
 Lt. Col. Francis Nash
 Lt. Col. Thomas Clark
 Lt. Col. William Davis
 Lt. Col. Robert Mebane
 Lt. Col. John Baptista Ashe
 Lt. William Lee Davidson

Known majors included
 Maj. Thomas Clark
 Maj. William Davis
 Maj. Caleb Granger
 Maj. John Walker
 Maj. John Baptiste Ashe
 Maj. John Nelson

Engagements
In 1777 the 1st North Carolina saw action at the battles of Brandywine and Germantown and it was present at White Marsh. Still led by Clark, it fought at Monmouth in June 1778. The North Carolina Brigade marched south under the command of James Hogun and arrived at Charlestown, South Carolina in March 1780. The 1st Regiment was captured by the British army at the Siege of Charleston on May 12, 1780. Clark and 287 men became prisoners. The regiment was reformed in the summer of 1781 and fought well in Jethro Sumner's brigade at Eutaw Springs in September that year. The 1st North Carolina was furloughed on April 23, 1783, at James Island, South Carolina and disbanded on November 15, 1783.

The complete list of engagements (battles and skirmishes) of the regiment include the following:

 December 22, 1775, Battle of Great Cane Brake in South Carolina
 December 23–30, 1775, Snow Campaign in South Carolina
 February 27, 1776, Battle of Moore's Creek Bridge in North Carolina
 March 8–12, 1776, Fort Johnston #4 in North Carolina
 April 6, 1776, Brunswick Town #1 in North Carolina
 May 1–3, 1776, Fort Johnston #5 in North Carolina
 May 11, 1776, Orton Mill & Kendal Plantation in North Carolina
 June 28, 1776, Battle of Sullivan's Island/Fort Moultrie #1 in South Carolina
 June 28, 1776, Breach Inlet Naval Battle in South Carolina
 September 1776, Florida Expedition
 September 11, 1777, Battle of Brandywine Creek in Pennsylvania
 October 4, 1777, Battle of Germantown in Pennsylvania
 June 28, 1778, Battle of Monmouth in New Jersey
 May 16, 1779, Near West Point in New York
 July 15, 1779, Stony Point in New York

 April 14, 1780, Battle of Monck's Corner #1  in South Carolina
 May 6, 1780, Lenud's Ferry in South Carolina
 May 7, 1780, Fort Moultrie #2 in South Carolina
 March 28 to May 12, 1780, Siege of Charleston 1780 in South Carolina
 March 15, 1781, Battle of Guilford Court House in North Carolina
 April 25, 1781, Battle of Hobkirk's Hill in South Carolina
 May 12, 1781, Battle of Fort Motte in South Carolina
 May 21 to June 19, 1781, Siege of Ninety-Six 1781 in South Carolina
 May 24 to June 1, 1781, Siege of Augusta in Georgia
 September 8, 1781, Battle of Eutaw Springs in South Carolina
 September 12, 1781, Hillsborough in North Carolina

Other Officers
Other officers included the surgeon, surgeon's mater, quartermaster, commissary, chaplain, muster master, deputy muster master, paymaster, and captains.  The captains led a company that included a lieutenant, ensign, sergeant, corporal, fifers, drummers, and privates.   The original captains of the 1st North Carolina Regiment included:

William Davis
Thomas Allon
Alfred Moore
Caleb Grainger
William Picket 
Robert Rowan
John Walker
Henry Dickson
George Davidson
William Green
Lieutenants.
John Lillington
Joshua Bowman
Lawrence Thompson
Thomas Hogg
William Berryhill
Hector McNeill
Absalom Tatum
Hezekiah Rice
William Brandon
William Hill

Original Ensigns

Neill McAlister
Maurice Moore, Jr.
John Taylor
Howell Tatum
James Childs
Henry Neill
Berryman Turner
George Graham
Robert Rolston
Henry Pope
James Holland

References

Bibliography

External links
Bibliography of the Continental Army in North Carolina compiled by the United States Army Center of Military History

North Carolina regiments of the Continental Army
Military units and formations established in 1775
Military units and formations disestablished in 1783